Gotta Be Me is the 7th studio album by rapper Devin the Dude, released on November 2, 2010. The first single "Jus Coolin" had been released on September the 27th.

Track listing

Sample credits
"Come & Go" - Contains a sample of "Let Me Down Easy" by Inez Foxx
"Gotta Be Me" - Contains a sample of "Free" by Deniece Williams
"I Like What You Do" - Contains a sample of "Love Me Back" by Willie Hutch
"No Need to Call" - Contains a sample of "Ring Ring Ring (Ha Ha Hey)" by De La Soul

References

2010 albums
Devin the Dude albums
Albums produced by Cozmo
Albums produced by Big Hollis
Real Talk Entertainment albums